The London Internet Providers EXchange ("LIPEX") was an Internet Exchange Point situated in London. It was founded in 2001 by three directors of commercial Internet Service Providers: Panny Malialis of Hotlinks, Chris Smith of The Communication Gateway Ltd and Boyan Marinkovich of Routo Telecom Ltd as a free of charge Internet Exchange Point sponsored by Allied Telesyn. In 2002 Panny Malialis took over sole running of LIPEX and changed it into a commercial business.

Lipex offered services in 6 POPS:
 Star Suite, Telehouse North
 Telehouse North
 Telehouse East
 TeleCityRedbus Harbour Exchange
 TeleCityRedbus Sovereign House
 TeleCityRedbus Meridian Gate

Other Internet exchange points in London 
 London Internet Exchange (LINX)
 London Network Access Point (LONAP)
 Packet Exchange
 Redbus Internet Exchange (RBIEX)
 XchangePoint

References

External links
 LIPEX
 EURO-IX

Internet exchange points in the United Kingdom
Telecommunications in the United Kingdom
Buildings and structures in the London Borough of Tower Hamlets
Media and communications in the London Borough of Tower Hamlets